Semisulcospira pacificans is a species of freshwater snail with an operculum, an aquatic gastropod mollusk in the family Semisulcospiridae.

Distribution 
This species occurs in Anhui Province and Zhejiang Province in Eastern China.

Ecology
Semisulcospira pacificans lives in fluvial habitats.

References

External links
  Heude P. M. (1888). (1882–1890). "Notes sur les Mollusques terrestres de la vallée du Fleuve Bleu". Mémoires concernant l'histoire naturelle de l'empire chinois par des pères de la Compagnie de Jésus, Mision Catholique, Chang-Hai. (1890). 4: 125[sic]-188, plates 33-43. page 164-165, plate XLI, fig. 22.

Semisulcospiridae
Taxa named by Pierre Marie Heude